In the 1985–86 Liga Leumit season Hapoel Tel Aviv won the title. Hapoel Haifa, Hapoel Jerusalem and Maccabi Sha'arayim were all relegated to Liga Artzit. Uri Malmilian of Beitar Jerusalem and Doron Rabinzon of Maccabi Petah Tikva were the league's joint top scorers with 14 goals.

The league championship was decided on the final day, with a match between the two title chasers, Maccabi Haifa and Hapoel Tel Aviv. Hapoel Tel Aviv, who needed a win to secure the championship, scored a controversial goal in the 86th minute to win 1–0 and the title.

Final table

Results

Final match 

On 24 May 1986, Hapoel Tel Aviv came face-to-face with Maccabi Haifa in a Liga Leumit fixture at Bloomfield Stadium, during the final rounds of the 1985–86 season. That match was the season's deciding match. Maccabi Haifa led by one point prior to the match. Hapoel Tel Aviv won with one goal scored at the 86th minute by  striker, Gili Landau, winning the match and the championship.

Background
At the beginning of the 1985–86 season, 16 football (soccer) clubs competed in the Liga Leumit, which was the top division at that time in Israel. Maccabi Haifa, which won the two previous league championships took early charge of the league, leading by five points at the 9th round. However, a rather poor string of results saw Hapoel Tel Aviv overtake Maccabi Haifa, taking a five-point lead at the top at the 19th round. At the 24th round, Maccabi Haifa was back on top, with 46 points and a two-point lead over Hapoel Tel Aviv, with Maccabi Tel Aviv also in the running, just points away. After the 29th round, with one match left to play, Maccabi Haifa led the table with 57 points. Hapoel Tel Aviv was second with 56 points. The two teams were to meet in the last round for a match that would decide the championship.

Pre-match

As Maccabi Haifa was leading by a point, a draw would be enough towards claiming their third straight championship, while Hapoel Tel Aviv needed to win their tenth championship. Due to the importance of the match, the IBA decided to broadcast the match live, the first ever live broadcast of a league match in Israel.

Match
With 20,000 fans in the stands, Maccabi Haifa sought to stall the match to force a 0-0 draw, which would allow them to win the championship. The first shot on goal was made by Zahi Armeli of Maccabi Haifa at the 24th minute, while Moris Zano of Hapoel registered their first shot at the 32nd minute. Early in the second half, Hapoel manager David Schweitzer substituted midfielders Jacob Cohen and Elior Baranes with strikers Gili Landau and Eli Yani, and Hapoel increased their attacks. At the 86th minute, Eli Cohen passed the ball to Moshe Sinai in midfield. Sinai lobbed the ball over the Maccabi Haifa defense towards the rushing Landau, while at the far left side of the defense, Eli Yani was running back from an offside position. Referee Zvi Sharir allowed the play to continue and Landau struck the ball over the Maccabi Haifa goalkeeper Avi Ran to break the deadlock. Eli Cohen was sent off for a tackle made on Rafi Osmo, but the score did not change. Hapoel Tel Aviv won the championship with a two-point lead.

Details

Post-match
While Hapoel Tel Aviv celebrated their championship, Maccabi Haifa sounded claims against the validity of the winning goal, pointing to Eli Yani's offside position during the final pass.  Referee Zvi Sharir defended his decision, stating that Eli Yani was in a "passive offside".

References

External links 

Israel 1985/86 RSSSF
The Leumit Table Maariv, 25.5.86, Historical Jewish Press 

Hapoel 1986
Maccabi Haifa F.C. matches
Liga Leumit matches
Liga Leumit seasons
1985–86 in Israeli football
Israel
1